In the 2006–07 season Chamois Niortais played in Ligue 2, the second tier of French football, following their promotion after winning the Championnat National in the previous season. Philippe Hinschberger started the campaign as team manager, but was replaced by Bosnian Faruk Hadžibegić in February 2007. Niort finished the season in 16th position with a record of 10 wins, 14 draws and 14 defeats from their 38 matches. The team reached the last 32 of the Coupe de France, but was knocked out of the Coupe de la Ligue in the first round.

Appearances and goals

Ligue 2

League table

Matches

Coupe de France

Coupe de la Ligue

References

Chamois Niortais F.C. seasons
Chamois Niortais